Umberto Smaila (born 26 June 1950) is an Italian actor, composer, comedian, television personality, entrepreneur and musician.

Born in Verona, in the early-1970s Smaila co-founded together with Jerry Calà, Franco Oppini and Ninì Salerno a cabaret-ensemble, "i gatti di Vicolo Miracoli". The group, reduced to three components since 1982 following Calà's departure, appeared on several successful TV programs and films and released several songs, including the hit singles "Verona Beat" and "Singer Solitude". After the disbandment of the group Smaila was the television presenter of a number of quiz and variety shows, most notably the late night show Colpo grosso. In the 1990s he founded the "U.S. Band", an orchestra with whom he performed in several television programs.

Smaila has composed musical scores for a number of films including Beast with a Gun (1977), Il ragazzo del pony express (1986), Sweets from a Stranger (1987), Delitti e profumi (1988) and Chicken Park (1994). The main theme of Beast with a Gun was later included in the soundtrack of Quentin Tarantino's Jackie Brown.

Smaila also wrote and directed a musical comedy film, Italian Boys, released in 1982. In 1990 he put on a theatre production on the life and music of Fred Buscaglione.

He is the founder of the brand Smaila's, a chain of restaurants and nightclubs specialized in live music.

References

External links 
 

1950 births
Italian male actors
Italian television presenters
Businesspeople from Verona
Mass media people from Verona
Italian film score composers
Italian male film score composers
Living people
Italian comedians
Musicians from Verona
Italian pianists
Ciak d'oro winners